Abul Hasan Hankari Abu Al Hasan Ali Bin Mohammad Qureshi Hashmi Hankari Harithi (born in 409 Hijri (c.1018 CE), in the town of Hankar), town of Mosul (city of northern Iraq, some 400 km north of Baghdad), died 1st Moharram 486 AH (1 February 1093 CE), in Baghdad, was a Muslim mystic also renowned as one of the most influential Muslim scholar, philosopher, theologian and jurist of his time and Sufi based in Hankar.

Biography
He was educated by his father. He was a man acquainted with the hidden secrets and was known for his Karamats. He would fast for 3 consecutive days and complete 2 whole Quran between Isha and Tahajjud. He devoutly stayed in worship day and night. He had the habit of practising excessive religious exercises and recitals. He travelled across many countries to get religious knowledge. From Rome to Spain to Harmain, etc. he met numerous scholars and shaikhs from whom he began to receive instruction in Fiqh and muhaddiths from whom he memorised hadith by heart. He even met Shaikh Abu al-Layla Misri and heard hadith from him. All Hafiz e Quran (memorisers of Quran), Muhaddiths (narrators of Hadiths), Qaries (reciters of Quran with correct accent and pronunciation) are given a chain of incredible narrators linking to the Islamic prophet Muhammad. He gained exoteric and esoteric education from the most prominent and influential scholars of his time. He even got spiritual beneficence from Bayazid Bastami. After sometime, he went back to his homeland. Hence, the people around him gave him a lot of respect and he gained fame. He earned the title of Shaikh-ul-Islam due to the unmatched religious knowledge and beneficence of the time. Countless seekers of Allah benefitted from him as he was an Arif Kamil. He was the Imam of Shariat and Tariqat of his time.  He wore the khirqa of khilafat from Muhammad Yousaf Abu al-Farah Tartusi who was the Qutb of that time.
The period between the 11th and 14th centuries is considered to be the "Golden Age" of Arabic and Islamic philosophy by the Stanford Encyclopedia of Philosophy, he has an important role to play in it as he was one of those early Sufis who brought logic into the Islamic seminary.

Ancestral lineage
Abul Hasan Hakari bin Sheikh Ahmed Muhammad Hakari bin Sheikh Muhammad Jafar Mehmood Hakari bin Sheikh Yusaf bin Sheikh Jafar urf Muhammad bin Umar bin Abdul Wahab bin Abu Sufyan bin Al-Harith bin Abdul Mutalib bin Hashim bin Abd Manaf ibn Qusai. His descendants later spread to the State of Bahawalpur, Azalah, Jhang, Gujranwala, Sialkot, Faisalabad, Lahore, Rahim yar Khan etc.

Saintly Lineage
The spiritual heritage of Faqr was passed on to Abul Hasan Hankari though the silsila of Junaid al-Baghdadi which makes him a spiritual descendant of the Islamic prophet Mohammad in the following order:

Muhammad
'Alī bin Abī Ṭālib
al-Ḥasan al-Baṣrī
Habib al Ajami
Dawud Tai
Maruf Karkhi
Sirri Saqti
Junaid Baghdadi
Abu Bakr Shibli
Abdul Aziz bin Hars bin Asad Yemeni Tamimi
Abu Al Fazal Abdul Wahid Yemeni Tamimi
Mohammad Yousaf Abu al-Farah Tartusi
Abu-al-Hassan Ali Bin Mohammad Qureshi Hankari
The Murshid of Abdul Qadir Jilani, Abu Saeed Mubarak Makhzoomi spent 18 years at the service of Abul Hasan Hankari and led the silsila after him.

Students
Abu Saeed Mubarak Makhzoomi was the khalifa-e-akbar (senior spiritual successor) while Tahir (son of Abul Hasan Hankari) was khalifa-e-asghar (junior spiritual successor).

Influenced
Abul Hasan Hankari influenced a lot of scholars and Islamic scholars alike most of whom have a notable name in the history such as:
Hujjat-ul-Islam Imam Mohammad Ghazali Tusi (505 H/1111 CE);
Hafiz Darqatni;
Sartaj Nehyan Ibn Jani;
Sartaj Bilfar Badee
Qadwari Shaikh Al-Hanafia (428H);
Avicenna (427H);
Imam Behqi;
 Abd al-Qahir al-Jurjani (471H);
Shaikh Abu al-Hassan al-Kharaqani.

Death
He died on 1st Moharram 486 H, 1 February 1093 CE during the Abbasid Caliphate. His shrine is the village of Hankar, Baghdad.

Further reading
 Zikr Hasan Allama Ghulam Dastgeer
 Al-Darul Munzim Fi Manaqib Ghaus-ul-Azam
 Tazkira Mashaikh Qadria Rizvia

See also
Shaikh Abdul Qadir Jilani
Mohammad Yousaf Abu al-Farah Tartusi
Mir Sayyid Ali Hamadani
Sultan Bahoo
Islamic Golden Age

References

1010s births
1093 deaths
11th-century Muslim theologians
Writers from Mosul
Iraqi Sufi saints
Hashemite people
11th-century Arabs